Marshall Brewing Company is a brewery in Tulsa, Oklahoma, USA. It opened in 2008 in a  facility outside downtown Tulsa, Oklahoma. It is the first commercial brewing facility in Tulsa since World War II. Currently, Marshall Brewing offers several year-round core beers, including Atlas IPA, Sundown Wheat, This Land Lager, Dunkel, Volks Pilsner, and This Machine Belgian-Style IPA. Outside of their core brands, Marshall Brewing offers over 30+ Seasonal beers throughout the year, including some only available at their Tulsa Tap Room, located at 1742 E 6th Street.

Their beers are available at bars, restaurants, liquor stores, and (as of Oct 1st, 2018) at Grocery and Gas Stations throughout the state of Oklahoma, as well as in select locations in  Arkansas. Previously, Marshall distributed beers in Kansas and Missouri.

Seasonal beers
In addition to the core offering, Marshall Brewing has also released several seasonal brews.

References

External links
Marshall Brewing Company

Beer brewing companies based in Oklahoma
Companies based in Tulsa, Oklahoma
American companies established in 2008
Food and drink companies established in 2008